Nadějkov is a municipality and village in Tábor District in the South Bohemian Region of the Czech Republic. It has about 700 inhabitants.

Administrative parts
Villages and hamlets of Bezděkov, Brtec, Chlístov, Číčovice, Hronova Vesec, Hubov, Kaliště, Křenovy Dvory, Modlíkov, Mozolov, Nepřejov, Petříkovice, Pohořelice, Šichova Vesec, Starcova Lhota, Větrov and Vratišov are administrative parts of Nadějkov.

History
The first written mention of Nadějkov is from 1373.

References

Villages in Tábor District